Nuchatlitz Provincial Park is a provincial park in British Columbia, Canada, located no the northwest side of Nootka Island, facing Nuchatlitz Inlet, on the west coast of Vancouver Island.  Established in 1996, the park contains approximately 2105 ha.

See also
Nuchatlitz, British Columbia

References

Provincial parks of British Columbia
Nootka Sound region
1996 establishments in British Columbia
Protected areas established in 1996